Ingrid Eberle (born 3 June 1957 in Dornbirn) is a retired Austrian alpine skier who competed in the 1980 Winter Olympics.

References 
 

1957 births
Living people
Austrian female alpine skiers
Olympic alpine skiers of Austria
Alpine skiers at the 1980 Winter Olympics
Sportspeople from Vorarlberg
People from Dornbirn